Edvin Alten (1876 – 1967) was a Norwegian judge.

He was born in Tønsberg. He worked as deputy under-secretary of State in the Ministry of Justice and the Police from 1918, and as a Supreme Court Justice from 1925 to 1948.

He was married to Ragna Aass (1880–1975). His daughter Berit married writer Asbjørn Aarnes, and his daughter Rønnaug became a notable actor, and was married to Georg Løkkeberg for some years.

References

1876 births
1967 deaths
Supreme Court of Norway justices
Norwegian civil servants
People from Tønsberg